Epicephala homostola is a moth of the family Gracillariidae. It is known from South Africa and Namibia.

References

Epicephala
Moths of Africa
Insects of Namibia
Moths described in 1961